Jorge Benegas (30 November 1922 – 26 August 2020) was an Argentine footballer. He played in five matches for the Argentina national football team in 1956 and 1957. He was also part of Argentina's squad for the 1957 South American Championship. Benegas died on 26 August 2020, at the age of 97.

References

External links
 

1922 births
2020 deaths
Argentine footballers
Argentina international footballers
Place of birth missing
Association football defenders
Independiente Rivadavia footballers
San Lorenzo de Almagro footballers
Independiente Santa Fe footballers
Millonarios F.C. players
Club Atlético Huracán footballers
Argentine expatriate footballers
Expatriate footballers in Colombia